The 21st Annual Goya Awards took place at the Palacio Municipal de Congresos in Madrid, Spain on 28 January 2007.

Volver won 5 awards, including those for Best Film, Best Director, Best Actress and Best Supporting Actress.

Winners and nominees

Major awards

Other award nominees

Honorary Goya
 Tedy Villalba

References

21
2006 film awards
2006 in Spanish cinema
2007 in Madrid
January 2007 events in Europe